Diplotheca is a genus of fungi in the family Myriangiaceae.

References

External links

Myriangiales
Dothideomycetes genera
Taxa described in 1893